Earlscourt Historic District is a residential historic district in Narragansett, Rhode Island, United States.  It is centered on a stretch of Earles Court, between Gibson Avenue and Noble Street, and includes a few properties on the adjacent Gibson Avenue and Woodward and Westminster Streets.  It includes nine residential properties developed in the 1880s and 1890s, during the height of Narragansett Pier's popularity as a summer resort community.  All are in the then-popular Shingle Style, and most were designed by well-known architects.  The Sherry Cottages, a series of four buildings on Gibson Avenue, were all designed by McKim, Mead & White, who also designed The Towers.  The other development is that on Earles Court, designed by D. J. Jardine and Constable Brothers for Edward Earle, a New York lawyer.  The central focus of this development is a stone water tower which bisects the roadway.

The district was listed on the National Register of Historic Places in 1982.

See also
National Register of Historic Places listings in Washington County, Rhode Island

References

Narragansett, Rhode Island
Historic districts in Washington County, Rhode Island
Shingle Style architecture in Rhode Island
Historic districts on the National Register of Historic Places in Rhode Island
National Register of Historic Places in Washington County, Rhode Island